Richard M. Haggerty is an American politician who represents the 30th Middlesex District in the Massachusetts House of Representatives, representing the towns of Woburn and Reading. As State Representative, Richard serves as Vice-Chair of the Joint Committee on Community Development and Small Business, and serves on the Joint Committee on Financial Services, the Joint Committee on Telecommunications, Utility, and Energy, along with the House Standing Committee on Global Warming and Climate Change.

Past experiences in the public service sector include his role as Woburn City Council President (2014-2019) and Alderman at Large (2010-2019).

Other notable leadership roles:

Richard also serves on the board of the Woburn Friends of VNA, is a board member of the Middlesex County Child Sexual Abuse Prevention Partnership, and is an active member of the Woburn Elks and the Woburn Historical Society.

Personal life 
Haggerty comes from a long line of public servants and community leaders. He is the great-grandson of J.D. Haggerty, who founded the Woburn Daily Times in 1901, and the grandson of Edward Costello a career firefighter from Medford, MA.

He received his Bachelor’s Degree from the University of New Hampshire in Political Science with a special concentration in Foreign Policy. He graduated from Woburn High School.

See also
 2019–2020 Massachusetts legislature
 2021–2022 Massachusetts legislature

External links

For a complete list of the bills sponsored by Rich during his time in office, please reference this link.

For a complete list of the bills co-sponsored by Rich during his time in office, please reference this link.

References

Living people
21st-century American politicians
Democratic Party members of the Massachusetts House of Representatives
University of New Hampshire alumni
People from Woburn, Massachusetts
Year of birth missing (living people)